KVRF 89.5 FM is a community radio station licensed to Sutton, Alaska.  The station airs a wide variety of music, including classical, folk, country, bluegrass, blues, jazz, soul, new-age and tropical, as well as local and national shows.  KVRF is owned by Radio Free Palmer, Inc.

Translators

See also
List of community radio stations in the United States

References

External links
KVFR's website

VRF
Variety radio stations in the United States
Community radio stations in the United States